Robert Lee Hubbs III (born April 19, 1995) is an American professional basketball player for the Kongsberg Miners of the FIBA Europe Cup and the Norwegian BLNO.

Hubbs was one of the most highly acclaimed recruits in University of Tennessee basketball history. 
 He had shoulder surgery which ended his freshman season after 12 games. As a sophomore, Hubbs averaged 7.2 points and 2.9 rebounds per game under coach Donnie Tyndall. He increased his averages to 10.6 points, 1.7 rebounds and 1.3 assists per game as a junior but missed some time with knee surgery. As a senior at Tennessee, Hubbs averaged 13.7 points, 4.6 rebounds and 1.7 assists per game and was named to the All-SEC Second Team. After the season he signed with KK Sutjeska of the Montenegrin league. In July 2018, he signed with the Kongsberg Miners in Norway.

References

External links
 Kongsberg Miners profile
 ESPN profile
 Tennessee Volunteers bio

1995 births
Living people
American expatriate basketball people in Montenegro
American expatriate basketball people in Norway
American men's basketball players
Basketball players from Tennessee
People from Dyer County, Tennessee
Shooting guards
Tennessee Volunteers basketball players
Kongsberg Miners players
Dyer County High School alumni